Tropical Storm Leslie was a weak, short-lived tropical cyclone that was never well-organized; however, its precursor was costlier than any other tropical cyclone in the 2000 Atlantic hurricane season. The twelfth named storm of the season, Leslie formed on October 4 over eastern Florida as a subtropical cyclone, out of a trough of low pressure. Strengthening over open waters, it attained enough tropical characteristics to be reclassified as Tropical Storm Leslie on October 5. The storm reached peak winds of 45 mph (75 km/h) before wind shear weakened it, and on October 7 transitioned into an extratropical cyclone over the open Atlantic Ocean. Leslie lasted three more days before losing its identity.

The precursor to Leslie produced torrential rainfall across Florida, peaking at 17.5 in (440 mm). The flooding damaged thousands of houses and caused three indirect deaths. Damage in southern Florida totaled $950 million (2000 USD), around half of which was from agricultural damage. After the flooding, portions of south Florida were declared a disaster area. Because of the limited impact as a tropical cyclone, the name Leslie was not retired in the Spring of 2001.

Meteorological history

On September 27, a tropical wave entered the eastern Caribbean Sea, believed to be the same that spawned Hurricane Isaac. It moved generally westward, and remained weak with sporadic thunderstorm activity. The wave traversed around the periphery of Hurricane Keith, and by October 2, the system produced a mid-level circulation just south of western Cuba. It continued to organize, prompting a reconnaissance aircraft to investigate the area. The system lacked a surface circulation center and remained an elongated trough of low pressure. The tropical wave interacted with an approaching frontal trough, while its mid-level center turned to the northeast and made landfall near Sarasota, Florida on October 4.

While over land, a surface circulation developed near Orlando, and the National Hurricane Center designated the system as Subtropical Depression One. The subtropical designation was because the convection was far-removed from the center. Additionally, an upper-level trough provided outflow, instead of an anticyclone as found in tropical cyclones. The subtropical depression moved to the east-northeast, and steadily organized as deep convection developed closer to the center. Initially, the strongest winds were 175 mi (280 km) from the center, but by the morning of October 5, the distance decreased to 85 mi (135 km). Based on its organization and winds of 40 mph (65 km/h), the system was re-designated as Tropical Storm Leslie.

The National Hurricane Center initially forecast further intensification to 60 mph (95 km/h), although the agency also noted that the circulation could dissipate, due its fast forward motion toward the east-northeast. Ultimately, wind shear prohibited significant strengthening, and Leslie attained peak winds of 45 mph (70 km/h). The storm interacted with an approaching cold front and became extratropical on October 7, 375 mi (600 km) north of Bermuda. It accelerated to the northeast and passed over Newfoundland on October 8. The remnants of Leslie turned to the east, then southeast, strengthening to near-hurricane-force winds before losing its identity near Ireland on October 10.

Preparations
The National Hurricane Center predicted the trough of low pressure to drop very heavy rainfall across western Cuba and Florida. The National Weather Service in Miami issued a flood watch for southern Florida, stating that the system could produce flooding on roads and in low-lying areas. In general, however, there was little warning for the flooding in South Florida. While Leslie was moving east-northeastward, it posed a threat to Bermuda, prompting officials to issue a tropical storm watch at 0300 UTC on October 6. Six hours later, tropical storm watch was upgraded to a tropical storm warning. However, the storm passed well to the west, and the warnings were dropped by late on October 6.

Impact

The precursor disturbance of Leslie dropped heavy rainfall across central and western Cuba, peaking at 8.25 in (210 mm) in the province of Havana. Numerous other areas reported over four in (100 mm), as well. In southern Florida, the disturbance produced torrential rainfall, with a maximum of 17.5 in (440 mm) in South Miami. Two areas, one to the south of Lake Okeechobee and the other being the Miami area, received over 10 in (255 mm) of rain. The torrential rainfall was described as similar to Hurricane Irene one year prior. Since it was an unnamed tropical depression at the time, it was locally referred to as the "no-name storm of 2000". The system produced two weak F0 tornadoes in Miami-Dade County, one of which tore off a roof of a fire station in Hialeah.

The torrential rainfall in Florida flooded about 93,000 homes, affecting 214,000 residents in Miami-Dade County. An incomplete damage survey of Miami-Dade County indicated the flooding destroyed 1,005 houses, severely damaged 1,358, and caused minor damage to 3,443. The flood waters, which were four ft (1.2 m) deep in places, stranded many in their houses, forcing them to use canoes or inflatable rafts to move to higher grounds. All schools in the Miami area were closed, and all non-essential Miami-Dade County employees were asked to stay home. Numerous flights in Miami International Airport were canceled or delayed, although the airport remained opened. The flooding, which was greatest in Sweetwater, West Miami, Hialeah, Opa-locka, and Pembroke Park, lasted up to a week in areas. The extreme flooding damaged electrical stations, leaving more than 27,000 without power. The flooding indirectly killed three people, two from drowning as a result of driving vehicles into deep water, and one when a man fell from a tall building while trying to unclog a roof drain. Property damage totaled $450 million.

Flood waters in Miami-Dade County covered about 40,000 acres (160 km²) of farmland. The damage was worsened since the flooding occurred at the beginning of the planting period for the winter season. Flooded nurseries and fields resulted in about $500 million in agricultural damage, including $60 million in tropical fruit and $397 million in ornamental crops. The U.S. Department of Agriculture declared 16 Florida counties, including Miami-Dade, Collier, and Palm Beach, as primary disaster areas due to flooding, making farmers and their families there eligible for USDA emergency farm loans. The same agency made 22 other counties, including Broward, eligible for loans due to their proximity to the disaster areas.

As an extratropical storm, Leslie produced winds of around 40 mph (65 km/h) while making landfall in Newfoundland. It also caused waves of up to 16 ft (five m) in height, and brought up to one in (30 mm) of rain. The overall impact in this region was minor.

Aftermath
In the immediate aftermath, cleanup workers could not work until the flood waters receded. In addition, abandoned cars blocked the path of utility workers. Following the storm, President Bill Clinton declared Broward, Collier, Miami-Dade, and Monroe Counties as disaster areas, allowing for the use of federal funds for the disaster victims. In addition, Miami-Dade and Broward Counties were declared eligible for Federal Infrastructure Assistance, which provided for 75% of the debris removal cost and the repairing or replacement of public roads, buildings, parks, and treatment plants. By ten days after the storm, government agencies distributed 105,000 meals,  of water, and 357,000 lb (162,000 kg) of ice. Thousands visited the five Disaster Recovery Centers, where information on disaster-related issues was given. By around two months after the flooding, over 51,000 people applied for federal aid, with assistance totaling to more than $170 million.

See also

 Other tropical cyclones named Leslie
 List of Florida hurricanes (2000–present)
 Timeline of the 2000 Atlantic hurricane season

Notes

References

External links

The NHC's archive on Tropical Storm Leslie
Tropical Cyclone Report

2000 Atlantic hurricane season
Atlantic tropical storms
Tropical Storm Leslie
Leslie